Nico Rizzelli (born 28 March 2000) is an English former professional rugby league footballer who last played as a  or er for the Swinton Lions in the RFL Championship, on loan from St Helens in the Betfred Super League.

Background
He signed from amateur team Rochdale Mayfield.

Career

St Helens
Rizzelli  made his first team début for St Helens on the  against the Salford Red Devils on 26 October 2020. Due to end-of-season fixture congestion caused by the COVID-19 pandemic, Saints fielded a very young side, resting the majority of first team players, in preparation of their derby match against Wigan just four days later.

Swinton Lions (loan)
On 28 April 2021 it was reported that he had signed for the Swinton Lions in the RFL Championship on a short two-week loan.

References

External links
St Helens profile

2000 births
Living people
English rugby league players
Rugby league centres
Rugby league wingers
St Helens R.F.C. players
Swinton Lions players